

This is a timeline of Colombian history, comprising important legal and territorial changes and political events in Colombia and its predecessor states.  To read about the background to these events, see History of Colombia.  See also the list of presidents of Colombia.

Millennia: 2nd BC–1st BC1st–2nd3rd

Centuries: 20th BC19th BC18th BC17th BC16th BC15th BC14th BC13th BC12th BC11th BC10th BC9th BC8th BC7th BC6th BC5th BC4th BC3rd BC2nd BC1st BC

16th century BC

13th century BC

7th century BC

3rd century BC

2nd century BC

1st century BC 

 Centuries: 1st2nd3rd4th5th6th7th8th9th10th11th12th13th14th15th16th17th18th19th20th

1st century

3rd century

6th century

7th century

10th century

15th century

16th century

17th century

18th century

19th century

20th century

21st century

See also
 Timeline of Bogotá
 Timeline of Cali
 Timeline of Cartagena, Colombia
 Colombian History X

References 

 Calderón Schrader, Camilo; Gil, Antonio; Torras, Daniel (2001), Enciclopedia de Colombia (4 volúmenes). Barcelona: céano Grupo Editorial, 2001.  (Obra completa)
  LABLAA Timeline of Colombian history

Further reading

External links
 BBC News. Colombia Profile: Timeline

 
Colombian
Years in Colombia
 

fr:Chronologie de la Colombie